The King Salman Mosque is the largest mosque in the Malé, Maldives, with a capacity of 10,000 worshippers.

The construction of the mosque was funded in part by Saudi Arabia and it is named after King Salman.

History 
The mosque was planned to commemorate the 50th anniversary of the independence of the Maldives. The construction of the mosque began in 2018. The opening of the mosque was scheduled in 2021, but was delayed as the structure remains unfinished. The mosque opened unofficially for prayers on April 2022. The official opening is yet to be announced.

Architecture 
The six-storeyed mosque building is flanked by five minarets, representing the five pillars of Islam. The building lacks a traditional dome. Instead, the dome-like structure is designed to resemble a Bedouin desert tent.

Facilities 
The mosque would also have a library, an auditorium, classrooms, and a multi-purpose hall.

References 

Mosques in Malé
Maldives–Saudi Arabia relations